Silberblick is the first studio album released by Joachim Witt in 1980.

Track listing 
All songs written by Joachim Witt, except where noted.
 "Kosmetik (Ich bin das Glück dieser Erde)" 6:19
 "Goldener Reiter" 4:41
 "Der Weg in die Ferne (Heaven)" (lyrics: Witt; music: David Byrne) 4:16
 "Meine Nerven" 5:35
 "Ich hab so Lust auf Industrie" 4:25
 "Mein Schatten (Na, Na, Na, Du Bandit, Du)" 3:59
 "Ja, Ja..." 3:30
 "Sonne hat sie gesagt" 9:00

Personnel
Joachim Witt - vocals, guitar, organ, synthesizer
Harald Gutowski - bass
Harald Grosskopf - synthesizer
Jaki Liebezeit - drums

1980 debut albums
Joachim Witt albums